The George Chandler School is an historic school building which is located in the Fishtown neighborhood of Philadelphia, Pennsylvania.

It was added to the National Register of Historic Places in 1988.

History and architectural features
Designed by Henry deCourcy Richards, the George Chandler School was built between 1907 and 1908. It is a two-and-one-half-story, "U"-shaped, brick building with a raised basement, which was designed in the Colonial Revival/Late Gothic Revival-style. It features stone trim and three large arched openings.

It was added to the National Register of Historic Places in 1988.

References

School buildings on the National Register of Historic Places in Philadelphia
Colonial Revival architecture in Pennsylvania
Gothic Revival architecture in Pennsylvania
School buildings completed in 1908
Bridesburg-Kensington-Richmond, Philadelphia
1908 establishments in Pennsylvania